Cheick "Iron Biby" Sanou (Cheick Ahmed al-Hassan Sanou) is a strongman from Bobo-Dioulasso, Burkina Faso. He is the 2018 and 2019 World Log Lift Champion and holds the Guinness World record for most overhead presses (of a person) in one minute.

Early life
Cheick Sanou was born in Burkina Faso and was a large child who was bullied at school; he earned the nickname "Biby" at an early age. He had early interests in sprinting, gymnastics and basketball. At age 17 he attended the University of Moncton, in Canada and earned a Business administration degree. During that time, he began weightlifting and was a true natural talent. In 2013, at age 21, Biby entered and won his first powerlifting competition. He said that after his strongman successes his nickname changed to "Iron Biby".

Career achievements

World record holder, 229 kg log lift, SSE Hydro, Glasgow, 18 September 2021.
 1st Place World Powerlifting Championship (junior class) (2014), both in bench press (217.5 kg) and deadlift (307.5 kg) at age 22
 4th Place Giants Live World Tour Finals Manchester 2017
 African Record 213 kg Log lift Personal Best 2018
 1st Place World Log Lift Championship 2018 (213 kg)
 3rd Place Ultimate Strongman Junior World Championships
 1st Place, log lift, Europe Strongest Man 2019 (220 kg)
 Tied for 5th place in Giants Live World Tour Finals Manchester 2019
 On March 1, 2020, he posted an unofficial overhead lift of 240 kg (529 lbs).
 On July 18, 2020, he posted an unofficial overhead lift of 260 kg (573,3 lbs). 
 217 kg/477.4 lb Axle Press (World Record) - Performed at the 2021 Strongman Classic at Royal Albert Hall.

References

External links
Video with interviews at Giants Live 2019

1992 births
Burkina Faso strength athletes
Living people
21st-century Burkinabé people